Samuel Mickle House, also known as the Hip Roof House, is located in Haddonfield, Camden County, New Jersey, United States. The house was built in 1736 and was added to the National Register of Historic Places on May 21, 1975.

See also
National Register of Historic Places listings in Camden County, New Jersey

References

Haddonfield, New Jersey
Houses on the National Register of Historic Places in New Jersey
Houses completed in 1736
Houses in Camden County, New Jersey
National Register of Historic Places in Camden County, New Jersey
1736 establishments in New Jersey
New Jersey Register of Historic Places